Guarnizo  is a village in the municipality of El Astillero (Real Astillero de Guarnizo) in Cantabria, Spain. 

According to the INE it had a population of 4,463 in 2010.

Economy

The area once supported shipbuilding and was the site where the Spanish Navy's ship of the line  Princesa or HMS Princess was built in 1730–1731. However it is the town's name, El Astillero, that reflects the shipbuilding industry.

Near the village the modern Astilleros de Santander shipyard is located, but performs repairs, conversion and upgrades only.

Populated places in Cantabria